Said Kandi (also Romanized as Sa‘īd Kandī; also known as Saiyid Kandi, Seytkendi, and Seyyed Kandī) is a village in Bughda Kandi Rural District, in the Central District of Zanjan County, Zanjan Province, Iran. In the 2006 census, its population was 205, in 43 families.

References 

Populated places in Zanjan County